Pontoporia may refer to:

 The La Plata dolphin (Pontoporia blainvillei)
 Pontoporia, one of the Nereids in Greek mythology